Wimmeria montana is a species of plant in the family Celastraceae. It is endemic to Mexico.

References

montana
Endemic flora of Mexico
Trees of Mexico
Endangered plants
Endangered biota of Mexico
Taxonomy articles created by Polbot